Tendai Maruma (born 24 September 1992) is a Zimbabwean first-class cricketer. He was included in Zimbabwe's squad for the 2016 Africa T20 Cup.

References

External links
 

1992 births
Living people
Zimbabwean cricketers
Southern Rocks cricketers
Sportspeople from Harare